A list of films produced in Argentina in 1982. In 1982 the Falklands War meant film production was lower than usual:

External links and references
 Argentine films of 1982 at the Internet Movie Database

1982
Argentine
Films